Water polo has been part of the Universiade program since the first games, in 1959.  A women's water polo tournament was introduced for the 2009 Summer Universiade. Water polo was not included in 1975 and 1989.

Medal winners 
Men

Women

Medal table 
Last updated after the 2019 Summer Universiade

References 

Sports123
Todor 66

 
Sports at the Summer Universiade
Universiade
Universiade